
Gmina Morzeszczyn is a rural gmina (administrative district) in Tczew County, Pomeranian Voivodeship, in northern Poland.

Villages
Gmina Morzeszczyn contains the villages and settlements of Bielsk, Borkowo, Brzeźno, Dzierżążno, Gąsiorki, Gętomie, Kierwałd, Królów Las, Lipia Góra, Majewo, Morzeszczyn, Nowa Cerkiew, Olsze, Olszówka, Piła, Rzeżęcin, Rzeżęcin-Pole, Suchownia and Ulgany.

Neighbouring gminas
Gmina Morzeszczyn is bordered by the gminas of Bobowo, Gniew, Pelplin, Skórcz and Smętowo Graniczne.

References
Polish official population figures 2006

Morzeszczyn
Tczew County